The state of Vermont owns around  of the  of track within the state. It leases it to Vermont Rail System, Green Mountain Railroad and Washington County Railroad. The state funds capital improvements; Vermont Rail System funds maintenance and runs freight over them.

The following railroads operate in the U.S. state of Vermont.

Common freight carriers

Canadian National Railway (CN)
Central Maine and Quebec Railway (CMQ) (Rail Acquisition Holdings)
Clarendon and Pittsford Railroad (CLP) (Owned by Vermont Railway)
Green Mountain Railroad (GMRC) (Owned by Vermont Railway)
New England Central Railroad (NECR) (Genesee and Wyoming)
New Hampshire Central Railroad (NHCR)
Pan Am Railways (PAR)
Pan Am Southern Railroad (PAS) (Operated by Pan Am Railways)
St. Lawrence and Atlantic Railroad (SLR) (Genesee and Wyoming)
Vermont Railway (VTR)
Washington County Railroad (WACR) (Owned by Vermont Railway)

Passenger carriers

Amtrak (AMTK)
Green Mountain Railroad (GMRC)

List of railroads

Private carriers
Lye Brook Railroad
Missisquoi Pulp and Paper Company
Moose River Lumber Company
Moose River Railroad
New England Power Company
New Hampshire Stave and Heading Mill

Electric
Barre and Montpelier Traction and Power Company
Bellows Falls and Saxton's River Street Railway
Bennington and Hoosick Valley Railway
Bennington and North Adams Street Railway
Bennington and Woodford Electric Railroad
Berkshire Street Railway
Brattleboro Street Railroad
Burlington and Hinesburgh Railway
Burlington Traction Company
Military Post Street Railway
Mount Mansfield Electric Railroad
Rutland Railway, Light and Power Company
Rutland Street Railway
St. Albans Street Railway
St. Albans and Swanton Traction Company
St. Johnsbury Street Railroad
Springfield Electric Railway
Springfield Terminal Railway (ST)
Twin State Gas and Electric Company
Vermont Company
Winooski and Burlington Horse Railroad

Not completed
Portland, Rutland, Oswego and Chicago Railroad
Rutland and Woodstock Railroad
Southern Vermont Railway

Notes

References

Bibliography 
 Association of American Railroads (2003), Railroad Service in Vermont (PDF). Retrieved May 11, 2005.
 Jones, Robert C. (1993).  Railroads of Vermont, vols. I and II, Shelburne, Vt.:New England Press.

 
 
Vermont
Railroads